Arp is an unincorporated community in Lauderdale County, Tennessee, in the United States. It is located along Tennessee State Route 19, approximately 5 miles northwest of Ripley.

History
A post office called Arp was established in 1899, and remained in operation until it was discontinued in 1907. The community was likely named in honor of Bill Arp, a humorist of the late 19th century.

References

Unincorporated communities in Lauderdale County, Tennessee
Unincorporated communities in Tennessee